Karel Zelenka (born March 31, 1983) is a Czech-Italian former competitive figure skater. He is a five-time (2003–2007) Italian national champion and competed at the 2006 Winter Olympics. He qualified to the free skate at eleven ISU Championships – three World, three World Junior, and five European Championships – and finished in the top ten twice.

Personal life 
Zelenka was born in 1983 in Louny, Czechoslovakia. His father is a figure skating coach. The family moved to Italy when the younger Zelenka was six years old. He received Italian citizenship in January 2006.

Career 
Zelenka debuted on the ISU Junior Series (ISU Junior Grand Prix) in 1997. He won the Italian junior title in the 1998–99 season and was sent to his first ISU Championship – 1999 Junior Worlds in Zagreb, Croatia, where he finished 20th after qualifying to the final segment.

Zelenka placed 19th at the 2000 Junior Worlds in Oberstdorf, Germany, and 8th at the 2001 Junior Worlds in Sofia, Bulgaria. In October 2001, he won the silver medal at his JGP assignment in Poland.

Zelenka won the first of his five consecutive senior national titles in the 2002–03 season. He reached the free skate at the 2003 European Championships in Malmö but was eliminated after the short program at the 2003 World Championships in Washington, D.C.

Zelenka competed at the 2006 Winter Olympics in Turin; he placed 25th in the short program and missed qualifying to the free skate by one spot. He achieved his career-best ISU Championship placement, 7th, at the 2007 European Championships in Warsaw.

He trained in Milan, Italy; Oberstdorf, Germany; and Switzerland.

Programs

Competitive highlights 
GP: Grand Prix; JGP: Junior Grand Prix

References

External links

 Official site
 

Italian male single skaters
Czech male single skaters
1983 births
Living people
Czech emigrants to Italy
Naturalised citizens of Italy
Olympic figure skaters of Italy
Figure skaters at the 2006 Winter Olympics
People from Louny
Sportspeople from the Ústí nad Labem Region